Man Without a Star is a 1955 American Western film directed by King Vidor and starring Kirk Douglas, Jeanne Crain, Claire Trevor and William Campbell. It was based on the novel of the same name, published in 1952, by Dee Linford (1915–1971). A remake was made for television in 1968 entitled A Man Called Gannon. In February 2020, the film was shown at the 70th Berlin International Film Festival, as part of a retrospective dedicated to King Vidor's career.

Plot
On a train to Wyoming from Kansas City, Dempsey Rae (Kirk Douglas) rescues young Jeff Jimson (William Campbell) from being run over by the train wheels after the brakeman throws Jeff off for freighthopping. Later that night, Dempsey and Jeff watch as another train hopper kills the brakeman. When the authorities try to arrest Jeff for the crime, Dempsey proves the other man was guilty. He is given half of the $100 reward for finding the murderer.

Dempsey has a female acquaintance in town (Idonee) and both men decide to stay, after being hired to work (as alleged fellow-Texans) by Strap Davis, on a 10,000 head ranch for its new owner Reed Bowman. Dempsey tells Jeff that many men follow a star to set their destination. When asked by Jeff what star he follows, Dempsey tells him that he follows no particular star. Dempsey teaches Jeff how to shoot, rope, ride, and herd cattle.

When Bowman finally arrives, Dempsey is surprised to find that he has been working for a very attractive woman (Jeanne Crain). Bowman has plans to triple the size of her herd, which will crowd out the other ranchers on the available range. Dempsey falls for her, but the inevitable range war Bowman creates prompts him to defect to the other side. He has a deep hatred for barbed wire, but he finds that there is no clear moral side to the fight.

After being estranged from his protégé, Dempsey finally comes to peace with Jeff before riding off to a new life.

Cast
Kirk Douglas as Dempsey Rae
Jeanne Crain as Reed Bowman
Claire Trevor as Idonee
William Campbell as Jeff "Texas" Jimson
Richard Boone as Steve Miles
Jay C. Flippen as Strap Davis
Myrna Hansen as Tess Cassidy
Mara Corday as Moccasin Mary
Eddy C. Waller as Tom Cassidy
Sheb Wooley as Latigo
George Wallace as Tom Carter
Frank Chase as Little Waco
Paul Birch as Mark Toliver
Roy Barcroft as Sheriff Olson
William Challee as Brick Gooder
Malcolm Atterbury as Fancy Joe Toole
Jack Elam appears (uncredited) as a ruffian who kills the train guard early in the movie.
Jack Ingram (actor) as Jessup (uncredited)

Production

Filming
In the scenes where Kirk Douglas's character is standing next to the cattle train, the car's identification marks state it was built in December 1923 (BLT 12-23) which was well after the film's late 1800s time period (there were no railroads in 1823).

Reception
Douglas later estimated he made over a million dollars from the film.

See also
List of American films of 1955

References

External links

1955 films
1955 Western (genre) films
American Western (genre) films
Films based on American novels
Films based on Western (genre) novels
Universal Pictures films
Films directed by King Vidor
1950s English-language films
1950s American films